Escape is maze video game for the ZX Spectrum developed by New Generation Software and published in 1982.

The cassette inlay reads: "Can you ESCAPE from the monsters? You must search through the
maze to find the axe which will enable you to break down the door and
ESCAPE. But it is not that easy—the Triceratops hides behind the
hedges and the Pteranodon soars over the maze to swoop down upon you"

Gameplay
The player has to search a maze displayed in primitive 3D for an axe, which will allow him to break the exit, and escape.  He is chased by initially a single dinosaur - each successful escape increases the number of dinosaurs roaming the maze, until level 5, which introduces a pterosaur that will occasionally take off and fly over the hedges, not being restricted to the maze paths.

Upon finding the axe, which is randomly placed for each level, the player slows down allowing the dinosaurs to catch up.

Reception
Sinclair User: "The game was written by the author of the J K Greye 3D Monster Maze and is one of the best and most original games we have seen for the Spectrum so far"

ZX Computing: "This is not, as it may sound a jump on the 'Pacman' bandwagon, but rather an original and absorbing game which can become extremely difficult and frustrating"

Popular Computing Weekly: "I would rate two of the games here Escape and Dictator as being amongst the best Spectrum games I have played"

References

External links

1982 video games
New Generation Software games
Video games developed in the United Kingdom
ZX Spectrum games
ZX Spectrum-only games